is a former Japanese football player.

Playing career
Iwasaki was born in Shizuoka Prefecture on April 9, 1971. After graduating from Shimizu Commercial High School, he joined his local club, Yamaha Motors (later Júbilo Iwata), in 1990. The club won the championship in 1992 and second place in 1993 and the club was promoted to the J1 League in 1994. However he did not play much, and retired at the end of the 1995 season.

Club statistics

References

External links

Júbilo Iwata

1971 births
Living people
Association football people from Shizuoka Prefecture
Japanese footballers
Japan Soccer League players
J1 League players
Japan Football League (1992–1998) players
Júbilo Iwata players
Association football defenders